Rika Hongo (born September 6, 1996) is a Japanese retired competitive figure skater who is a two-time (2015–16) Four Continents bronze medalist, 2014 Rostelecom Cup champion, 2015 Finlandia Trophy champion and 2014–15 Japanese national silver medalist.

Personal life 
Rika Hongo was born on September 6, 1996, in Sendai, Japan. Her mother, Yuko, is a former figure skater. Her father is from the United Kingdom. In 2015, Hongo attended Chukyo University.

Career

Early years 
Hongo began skating in 2001. She moved to Nagoya at age nine to train under coach Hiroshi Nagakubo. Shizuka Arakawa was named as an influence in a 2006 report.

2012–2013 season 
Hongo debuted on the ISU Junior Grand Prix series in the 2012–13 season. She won a silver medal in Courchevel, France and placed fifth in Croatia. Along with Satoko Miyahara, she was selected to represent Japan at the 2013 World Junior Championships in Milan, Italy. Hongo placed seventh in the short program, tenth in the free skate, and finished ninth overall.

2013–2014 season 
Hongo started the 2013–14 season with a fourth-place finish at JGP Mexico and then won a bronze medal at JGP Belarus. At the 2014 World Junior Championships in Sofia, Bulgaria, she placed eleventh in the short program, seventh in the free skate, and eighth overall. Making her senior international debut, Hongo won gold at the 2014 Triglav Trophy, her final event of the season.

2014–2015 season 
Hongo began the 2014–15 season with gold at the Asian Open and then bronze at the 2014 Finlandia Trophy, an ISU Challenger Series event. Making her senior Grand Prix debut, she finished fifth at the 2014 Skate Canada International after placing fifth in the short program and free skate. At her second Grand Prix event, the 2014 Rostelecom Cup, Hongo won the gold medal ahead of Russia's Anna Pogorilaya by 4.57 points after placing second in the short program and winning the free skate. Hongo was first alternate to the Grand Prix Final and was later called on to compete after qualifier Gracie Gold withdrew with a foot injury. She finished sixth overall after placing fifth in the short and free programs.

At the Japan Championships, Hongo won the short program and placed second in the free skate, winning the silver medal behind Satoko Miyahara and earning her first medal at Japanese Nationals. At the 2015 Four Continents, she placed third in the short and long programs, capturing the bronze medal behind gold medalist Polina Edmunds and silver medalist Miyahara.

Hongo made her senior worlds debut at the 2015 World Championships in Shanghai, where she earned personal bests in all segments of the competition. She finished sixth overall after placing fifth in both segments.

2015–2016 season 
Hongo began her season by winning both segments in a domestic competition called the Summer Cup, held in Shiga prefecture, Japan. Two months later, she outscored Yulia Lipnitskaya by 15.12 points to win gold at a Challenger Series event, the 2015 CS Finlandia Trophy, where she obtained a personal best total score of 187.45 points. Hongo then won silver at 2015 Cup of China, but placed fifth at 2015 Rostelecom Cup, and as a result, did not qualify for the Grand Prix Final. She placed 4th at the Japan Championships.

Ranked 4th in the short and 5th in the free, Hongo came away with the bronze medal at the 2016 Four Continents in Taipei, behind Satoko Miyahara and Mirai Nagasu. She finished 8th at the 2016 World Championships in Boston.

2016–2017 season 
Hongo finished 4th at the 2016 CS Autumn Classic International and 6th at her first GP event of the season, 2016 Skate Canada International. She placed 5th at both of her December competitions, the 2016 Cup of China and the Japan Figure Skating Championships.

Hongo replaced the injured Satoko Miyahara at the 2017 Four Continents Championships, finishing 10th.

2017–2018 season 
Hongo began her season with a silver medal at the 2017 CS Ondrej Nepela Trophy.

2019–2020 season 
Hongo decided to take a hiatus from skating, despite having had a new “Ghost in the Shell”-themed free skate choreographed for her by Shae-Lynn Bourne in May 2019. It was unknown whether she would return to competitive skating.

2020–2021 season 
Hongo competed at the Chubu Regionals, a qualifier for the 2020–21 Japan Championships and placed second behind Mako Yamashita and ahead of Rin Nitaya. She finished first in the free skate. She later placed eighteenth at the Japan Championships.

Hongo announced her retirement from competitive skating on June 15, 2021.

Programs

Competitive highlights
GP: Grand Prix; CS: Challenger Series; JGP: Junior Grand Prix

Detailed results

Senior level

Small medals for short program and free skating awarded only at ISU Championships. At team events, medals awarded for team results only.

Junior level

References

External links 
 
 

1996 births
Japanese female single skaters
Figure skaters at the 2017 Asian Winter Games
Asian Games competitors for Japan
Living people
Sportspeople from Sendai
Japanese people of British descent
Four Continents Figure Skating Championships medalists
Female sports medalists